Stanley Quin (17 April 1908 – 27 November 1967) was an Australian cricketer. He played 24 first-class cricket matches for Victoria between 1931 and 1938.

See also
 List of Victoria first-class cricketers

References

External links
 

1908 births
1967 deaths
Australian cricketers
Victoria cricketers
Cricketers from Melbourne
People from Caulfield, Victoria